Derecka Purnell is an American lawyer, writer, and organizer. She is best known for her 2021 memoir Becoming Abolitionists, which received positive reviews from Boston Review, PEN America, Kirkus, and others.

Life and career 
Purnell was born and raised in St. Louis, Missouri. She received her bachelor's degree from University of Missouri-Kansas City.

She became politically active in college after the killing of Trayvon Martin, and at the time advocated for police reform. She also organized during the Ferguson Uprising after the death of Michael Brown. Purnell began to study writers such as Rachel Herzing and Ruth Wilson Gilmore, who argue for police abolition. She received her jurisprudence degree from Harvard Law School.

Purnell is a human rights lawyer and writer. She advocates for defunding the police to invest in basic services thought to be the root of crime, such as housing and healthcare. She co-authored the policy proposal #8ToAbolition.

She published her debut book, a memoir called Becoming Abolitionists: Police, Protests, and the Pursuit of Freedom under Astra House in October 2021. She was inspired to write the book after widespread conversation related to prison abolition resulted from the George Floyd protests. The book was selected as a Best Book of 2021 by Kirkus Reviews.

Purnell has two children.

Works

References

External links 
 

Year of birth missing (living people)
Living people
21st-century African-American women
African-American women writers
Writers from St. Louis
Civil rights lawyers
Harvard Law School alumni
University of Missouri–Kansas City alumni
African-American women lawyers
Prison abolitionists